GRES-2 may refer to:

Ekibastuz GRES-2
Surgut-2 Power Station
Tomsk GRES-2